William J. Higginson (December 17, 1938 – October 11, 2008) was  an American poet, translator and author most notable for his work with haiku and renku, born in New York City. He was one of the charter members of the Haiku Society of America, and was present at its formation meeting in 1968.

Life
Higginson attended Massachusetts Institute of Technology, then joined the United States Air Force, and was sent by them to study Japanese at Yale University, where his interest in haiku began.

Career
He served for two years at Misawa Air Base in Japan in the early 1960s. Upon return to the US he completed his undergraduate studies, obtaining a BA in English at Southern Connecticut State College in 1969. He edited Haiku Magazine from 1971 to 1976, and ran the literary From Here Press, which published titles by several well-known authors, including Allen Ginsberg, Elizabeth Searle Lamb, and Ruth Stone.

Legacy

Higginson's experience in Japan led him to conclude "the 17 sound structure of Japanese haiku did not translate into 17 syllables in English" and in his translations therefrom stressed more upon "the order of images, the grammar between them (or lack thereof) and the psychological effect of the poems". Higginson's aim was to "bring haiku, full bore into the heat of our own time and place" and make it "a contemporary living art" whilst still remembering that "in Japan they talk of composing haiku rather than writing them".
 
The primary purpose of reading and writing haiku, Higginson thought, "was in sharing moments of our lives that have moved us, pieces of experience that we offer or share as gifts".

Major works

His three major works, The Haiku Handbook (1985), Haiku World (1996), and The Haiku Seasons (1996), all continue to sell well with internet booksellers, while The Haiku Handbook is one of the most widely read English-language haiku books.

Bibliography

 Itadakimasu: Essays on haiku and senryu in English. J & C Transcripts, 1971
 Cycing Paterson: a Haiku / Senryu Sequence. Seer Ox, 1974
 Christmas night in Paterson. From Here Press, 1975
 Don't you build your highway here. From Here Press, 1975
 Thistle Brilliant Morning: Translations from the Japanese (translator). From Here Press, 1975
 Eastrie. From Here Press, 1975
 Used poems (with Penny Harter). Winter Solstice, 1978
 Union County literature today (with Penny Harter). From Here Press, 1980
 Death Is & Approaches to the Edge. From Here Press, 1981
 Paterson Pieces: Poems 1969-1979. Old Plate Press, 1981
 The big waves : Meisetsu, Shiki, Hekigotō, Kyoshi, Hakyō (translator). Fanwood, 1989
 The Haiku Handbook: How to Write, Share, and Teach Haiku (with Penny Harter). McGraw-Hill, 1985
 The Healing. From Here Press, 1986
 Ten years' collected haiku : volume 1. From Here Press, 1987
 Seasoned haiku : a report on haiku selected by the seasons for publication in Frogpond in 1990, with an invitation to participate. Fanwood, 1990
 Wind in the Long Grass: A Collection of Haiku (an anthology for children). Simon & Schuster, 1991
 Met on the Road: A Transcontinental Haiku Journal. Press Here, 1993
 Haiku Compass: Directions in the Poetical Map of the United States of America. Haiku International Association, 1994
 Haiku World: An International Poetry Almanac. Kodansha, 1996
 The Haiku Seasons: Poetry of the Natural World. Kodansha, 1996
 The seasons in haikai. Irvington Press, 1996
 Red Fuji: Selected Haiku of Yatsuka Ishihara (translator with Tadashi Kondō). From Here Press, 1997
 Over the Wave: Selected Haiku of Ritsuo Okada (translator). From Here Press, 2001
 Kiyose: Seasonword Guide. From Here Press, 2005
 A Summer Surgery / Waiting (with Penny Harter). From Here Press, 2005
 Sixty instant messages to Tom Moore (with Paul Muldoon and Lee Gurga). Modern Haiku Press, 2005
 Butterfly Dreams: The Seasons through Haiku and Photographs CD-ROM with photographs by Michael Lustbader, 2006
 Surfing on Magma. From Here Press, 2006
 4 Sequences. From Here Press, 2007

Grants, awards, and other recognitions

 Member, Selection Committee for the Masaoka Shiki International Haiku Awards in International Haiku, Ehime Prefecture Culture Foundation, Japan (2000, 2002, 2004).
 Honorary Curator, American Haiku Archive, California State Library, Sacramento, California, USA (2003–2004).
 Haiku Society of America Merit Book Award for translation (with Tadashi Kondō), for Red Fuji: Selected Haiku of Yatsuka Ishihara (1998).
 Translation Grant, Witter Bynner Foundation for Poetry (1994).
 Inducted into the New Jersey Literary Hall of Fame (1989).
 Member, Governor's Task Force on Literacy in the Arts, a New Jersey Educational Commission (1987–1989).
 Haiku Society of America Merit Book Award for Textbook/Scholarly Work (with Penny Harter), for The Haiku Handbook: How to Write, Share, and Teach Haiku (1986).
 Writing Fellowship in Poetry, New Jersey State Council on the Arts (1977).
 Haiku Society of America Merit Book Award for critical writing, for Itadakimasu: Essays on Haiku and Senryu in English (1974, one of the first Merit Book Awards).
 Prize for Best Haiku of the Meeting, Haiku Society of America (May 1969):

The clock
     chimes, chimes and stops,
          but the river . . .

See also

Monostich
Haiku
Haiku in English

References

 Autobiographical notes
 Higginson's interview with Amazon.com

External links

'From one-line poems to haiku'
 Higginson's Renku Home website
 Higginson's Haikai Home website
 Finding aid to William J. Higginson papers at Columbia University. Rare Book & Manuscript Library.

1938 births
2008 deaths
20th-century American poets
English-language haiku poets
Poets from New Jersey
Japanese–English translators
American Japanologists
21st-century American poets
20th-century American translators
21st-century American translators
American male poets
20th-century American male writers
21st-century American male writers
20th-century American non-fiction writers
21st-century American non-fiction writers
American male non-fiction writers